A mockingbird is a bird known for its mimicking habits.

Mockingbird may also refer to:

Arts, entertainment, and media

Fictional characters
 Mockingbird, leader of the Secret Six in the DC Comics Universe
 Mockingbird (Marvel Comics), in the Marvel Comics Universe

Film and television
 Mockingbird (film), a 2014 found footage film by Bryan Bertin
 ″Mockingbird″ (Game of Thrones), a 2014 episode of the TV series Game of Thrones

Literature
 Mockingbird (Erskine novel), a 2010 young-adult novel by Kathryn Erskine
 Mockingbird (Tevis novel), a 1980 novel by Walter Tevis
 Mockingbird, a 1988 novel by Sean Stewart
 Mockingbird, a 2012 novel by Chuck Wendig

Music
 The Mockingbirds, 1960s band, precursor to 10cc
 Mockingbird (Derek Webb album), 2005
 Mockingbird (Allison Moorer album), 2008

Songs
 "Mockin' Bird", a song by Tom Waits from the 1991/1993 album set The Early Years
 "Mocking Bird", a song by Barclay James Harvest from the 1971 album Once Again
 "Mockingbird" (Inez & Charlie Foxx song), 1963,  remade by Carly Simon and James Taylor in 1974
 "Mockingbird", a song by Current 93 from the 1998 album Soft Black Stars 
 "Mockingbird", a song by The Libertines from the 2002 album Up the Bracket
 "Mockingbird" (Eminem song), 2005
 "Mockingbird" (Rob Thomas song), 2010
 "Mockingbirds", a song by Grant Lee Buffalo from the 1994 album Mighty Joe Moon
 "The Mocking Bird", a 1952 song by The Four Lads
 "Mockingbird", also known as "Hush, Little Baby", a lullaby

Other uses
 
 Mockingbird (DART station), a DART Light Rail station in Dallas, Texas
 Operation Mockingbird, the unconfirmed Central Intelligence Agency program to influence the press
 Project Mockingbird, the confirmed CIA wire tapping operation mentioned in the Family Jewels report

See also
 Mockingbird Don't Sing, a 2001 American film
 To Kill a Mockingbird (disambiguation)
 Mockingjay (disambiguation)